The Airmount Grave Shelter, also known as the Hope Family Grave Shelter is a brick grave shelter, or grave house, located in the Airmount Cemetery near Thomasville, Alabama.  It is unusual in that it protects six graves instead of the more common one grave.  The brick structure was built in 1853 by John Hope.  It is built in a vernacular Greek Revival style with a gabled roof.  The interior features a wooden vaulted ceiling.  The shelter was placed on the National Register of Historic Places on February 24, 2000, as a part of the Clarke County Multiple Property Submission.

Burials

The shelter contains the graves of the following individuals:
 Archibald H. Hope (1823–1850)
 Margaret Hope (1797–1851)
 Jane A. Hope (1813–1852)
 John Allison Hope (1855–1856)
 John Hope (1791–1868)
 Sarah Jane Powell Hope (1829–1885)

References

External links

 

National Register of Historic Places in Clarke County, Alabama
Infrastructure completed in 1853
Buildings and structures in Alabama
Greek Revival architecture in Alabama
Cemeteries on the National Register of Historic Places in Alabama